Caribbean (Spanish: Caribeña) is a 1953 drama film directed by José Baviera. It was a co-production between Mexico and Guatemala.

Cast
   Armando Calvo  
 Anabelle Gutiérrez  
 José Baviera  
 Pedro Vargas 
 Rosario Gutiérrez

References

Bibliography 
 María Luisa Amador. Cartelera cinematográfica, 1950–1959. UNAM, 1985.

External links 
 

1953 films
1953 drama films
Mexican drama films
Guatemalan drama films
1950s Spanish-language films
Films directed by José Baviera
Mexican black-and-white films
Guatemalan black-and-white films
1950s Mexican films